is a private university in Tokushima, Japan.

External links
Official Site 
Official Site 

Universities and colleges in Tokushima Prefecture
Private universities and colleges in Japan
Tokushima (city)